Jane Törnqvist (born 9 May 1975) is a former footballer who most recently played for Kopparbergs/Göteborg FC. A tough tackling central defender, she wore number 3 for her club. She played 109 games for the Sweden women's national team before retiring from international football in 2005. She also served as the Strength and Conditioning coach of India women's football team for the 2022 AFC Women's Asian Cup.

Career

Club
Törnqvist started her career in Hallsta IK. Törnqvist played for Häverödals SK, Rimbo IF, Tyresö FF, Hammarby IF and Älvsjö AIK.

When Älvsjö AIK and Djurgårdens IF merged to become Djurgården/Älvsjö, Törnqvist was on the new team. Törnqvist played five seasons with the team. She was part of the 2003 and 2004 Damallsvenskan winning teams. She also played in the 2005 UEFA Women's Cup Final, when Djurgården/Älvsjö lost to 1. FFC Turbine Potsdam. She retired after the 2007 season, however Kopparbergs/Göteborg FC manager Torbjörn Nilsson managed to bring her to his team. In late 2007, Törnqvist joined Kopparbergs/Göteborg FC. During her time with Kopparbergs/Göteborg FC, she made 100 league appearances and scored 13 goals. She finished her career in 2012.

International
After winning seven caps at Under 17 level and 33 Under 21 caps, Törnqvist made her senior Sweden debut in a 3–0 win over Finland on 30 August 1995. She tore her ACL during UEFA Women's Euro 2001 and missed Sweden's extra time defeat to Germany in the final. Two years later she was back in the team as Sweden suffered another golden goal loss to Germany in the World Cup final.

Jane Törnqvist appeared for Sweden in two World Cups (USA 1999, USA 2003), and two Olympic Games (Sydney 2000, Athens 2004). She played in three European Championship tournaments: Norway/Sweden 1997, Germany 2001, and England 2005.

Matches and goals scored at World Cup & Olympic tournaments

Matches and goals scored at European Championship tournaments

Honours

Club 

 Djurgårdens IF
 Damallsvenskan (2): 2003, 2004

Footnotes

References

Match reports

External links
 Club Profile
 National Team Profile
 

Living people
1975 births
Sportspeople from Manila
Filipino emigrants to Sweden
Swedish people of Filipino descent
Swedish women's footballers
Olympic footballers of Sweden
Sweden women's international footballers
1999 FIFA Women's World Cup players
2003 FIFA Women's World Cup players
FIFA Century Club
Tyresö FF players
Hammarby Fotboll (women) players
Älvsjö AIK (women) players
Djurgårdens IF Fotboll (women) players
BK Häcken FF players
Women's association football central defenders